Nicholas Wilson (born 9 June 1960 in Quebec City) is a British former alpine skier who competed in the 1984 Winter Olympics.

References

External links
 

1960 births
Living people
Skiers from Quebec City
British male alpine skiers
Olympic alpine skiers of Great Britain
Alpine skiers at the 1984 Winter Olympics